The 1959–60 Cincinnati Royal season was the 15th season of the franchise, its 12th season in the NBA and third season in Cincinnati.

Regular season

Season standings

x – clinched playoff spot

Record vs. opponents

Game log

Player statistics

References

Sacramento Kings seasons
Cincinnati
Cincinnati
Cincinnati